The Voice Within is a 1946 British crime drama film directed by Maurice J. Wilson and starring Barbara White, Kieron Moore and Brefni O'Rorke. It was the film debut of Moore who went on to appear in several major roles over the following years. It was shot at the Riverside Studios in Hammersmith.

Cast
Barbara White as Kathleen
Kieron Moore as Denis O'Shea 
Shaun Noble as Roy O'Shea
Violet Farebrother as Grandma
Olive Sloane as 	Fair Owner's Wife
Brefni O'Rorke as Sergeant Sullivan
George Merritt as 	McDonnell
Paul Merton as Constable Patrick O'Day
Hay Petrie as Fair Owner
Johnnie Schofield as Lorry Driver
Philip Godfrey as Elderly Smuggler
Norman Pierce as Publican
Henry Wolston as Constable Rowley
Jack Vyvyan as Constable O'Kelly
Clifford Buckton as 1st I.R.A. Man
Charles Rolfe as 2nd I.R.A. Man
Frank Atkinson as Farmer

References

External links

British crime drama films
1946 crime drama films
British black-and-white films
Films shot at Riverside Studios
1940s British films